The Little River is a  stream in the towns of Kingston and Brentwood in Rockingham County, New Hampshire, United States. It is a tributary of the Exeter River, part of the Great Bay/Piscataqua River watershed in the New Hampshire Seacoast region.

The Little River rises in the northwestern part of Kingston and follows a winding course generally northeast through flat or slightly hilly terrain. The river turns north as it enters Brentwood and reaches the Exeter River east of Brentwood's town center.

See also

List of rivers of New Hampshire

References

Rivers of New Hampshire
Rivers of Rockingham County, New Hampshire